The following list is a discography of production by Nick Jonas, an American singer and record producer. It includes a list of songs produced, co-produced and written sorted by year, artist, album and title.

Songwriting and production credits

See also 
List of songs recorded by Nick Jonas

References

External links 

Nick Jonas on Allmusic

Songs written by Nick Jonas
Nick Jonas
Jonas Brothers